The following is the population of the historic county of Middlesex (including the City of London) as given at each ten-yearly census from 1801 to 1881:

* The figures for 1881 in the source do not cross-cast precisely. The source gives figures for a very large number of subdivisions of the hundreds etc., including parishes and many small extra-parochial areas, especially in and around the City of London. The treatments from one census to the next are not precisely consistent.

References

History of Middlesex
Social history of London
19th century in Middlesex